This is a list of sports events in South America, showing the companies holding broadcasting rights under contract. Companies with rights to a wide range of sports include ESPN.

Badminton
ESPN: Thomas Cup & Uber Cup; BWF World Tour

Baseball
Major League Baseball
ESPN: Domingo de Grandes Ligas; Lunes de Grandes Ligas; Miércoles de Grandes Ligas; Tuesday, Friday and Saturday games; Festival de Cuadrangulares; All Star Game; Wild-Card Game; Division Series; League Championship Series; World Series.
DirecTV: MLB Extra Innings

Other baseball
Mexican League: ESPN
Little League World Series: ESPN
College baseball: ESPN
Liga Venezolana de Beisbol Profesional: IVC Networks, TLT

Basketball

National Basketball Association 
ESPN: Wednesday and Friday games (mostly doubleheaders); Saturday games (including all ABC games); ESPN USA/ABC games on Sunday and Monday; Mexico games; NBA All-Star Weekend; select NBA playoffs (including ESPN/ABC conference finals) and NBA Finals.
DirecTV Sports, NBA TV and NBA League Pass: Regular Season and Playoffs.

FIBA events 
DirecTV Sports: Basketball Champions League Americas, FIBA EuroBasket, FIBA EuroBasket Women, FIBA Americas Championship, FIBA World Championship, FIBA World Championship for Women

Other basketball  
ESPN: WNBA, FIBA Intercontinental Cup, Liga ACB, Copa del Rey de Baloncesto, Supercopa de España de Baloncesto, Basketball Africa League, Women's National Basketball League, NCAA Basketball, NBA Summer League, The Basketball Tournament and NBA G League
TyC Sports: Liga Nacional de Básquet and Torneo Nacional de Ascenso

Boxing
ESPN: ESPN Knockout (includes Top Rank, Premier Boxing Champions and Bare Knuckle Fighting Championship)
DAZN: Golden Boy Promotions, Matchroom Sport, Dream Boxing

Cricket
ESPN: Cricket World Cup, ICC World Cup Qualifier, ICC World Twenty20, ICC T20 World Cup Qualifier, Under 19 Cricket World Cup and Australia national cricket team

Cycling
ESPN: Tour de France; Tour de France Femmes; Vuelta a España; Tour Down Under; Paris–Nice; Tour de Romandie; Critérium du Dauphiné; Vuelta a San Juan; Tour Colombia; Tour of Flanders; Paris–Roubaix; Liège–Bastogne–Liège; Omloop Het Nieuwsblad; Gent–Wevelgem; Dwars door Vlaanderen; Amstel Gold Race; La Flèche Wallonne; Scheldeprijs; Brabantse Pijl; Paris–Tours; UCI Road World Championships; UCI Track Cycling World Championships; UCI BMX World Championships; UCI Mountain Bike World Championships; UCI Cyclo-cross World Cup
DirecTV Sports: Giro d'Italia, UAE Tour, Tirreno–Adriatico, Tour de Suisse, Strade Bianche, Milan–San Remo, Milano–Torino, Giro di Lombardia, Classic Brugge–De Panne, E3 Saxo Bank Classic, Tour of the Basque Country, GP Miguel Induráin.

Extreme sports
ESPN: X Games

Field hockey
ESPN: Women's FIH Hockey World Cup, Men's FIH Hockey World Cup, Women's FIH Pro League, Men's FIH Pro League, Euro Hockey League, Women's Indoor Hockey World Cup and Men's Indoor Hockey World Cup

Figure skating
ESPN: European Figure Skating Championships; Four Continents Figure Skating Championships

Gridiron football
National Football League
ESPN: NFL Draft; NFL RedZone; Sunday Night Football; Monday Night Football; Wild Card games; Division games; Conference Championship games; Pro Bowl; Super Bowl
DirecTV: Sunday Ticket games

NCAA College Football
ESPN: Regular season (ESPN or ABC games); selected bowl games; College Football Playoff
Claro Sports: College Football on CBS

Other
ESPN: XFL

Golf
ESPN: The Masters; PGA Championship; U.S. Open; The Open Championship; World Golf Championships; PGA Tour; PGA European Tour; Presidents Cup; Ryder Cup; U.S. Women's Open; U.S. Senior Open and U.S. Senior Women's Open; Women's British Open; Senior Open; Senior PGA Championship; Augusta National Women's Amateur; U.S. Women's Amateur; Asia-Pacific Amateur Championship; Latin America Amateur Championship; Women's Asia-Pacific Amateur Championship
Golf Channel: The Open Championship; World Golf Championships; PGA Tour; Champions Tour; Ryder Cup; Web.com Tour

Handball
ESPN: European Men's Handball Championship; European Women's Handball Championship

Horse racing
ESPN: Kentucky Derby; Preakness Stakes; Belmont Stakes; Pegasus World Cup; Saudi Cup; Dubai World Cup; Grand National; Epsom Derby; Royal Ascot; Irish Derby; King George VI and Queen Elizabeth Stakes; Haskell Stakes; Sussex Stakes; International Stakes; Irish Champion Stakes; British Champions Day; Breeders' Cup; Melbourne Cup; Bahrain International

Ice hockey
ESPN: NHL; Swedish Hockey League

Kickboxing
DAZN: King of Kings: October 2022 to October 2025, all fights
DirecTV Sports: Glory, Karate Combat, WGP Kickboxing

Marathon
ESPN: Tokyo Marathon, Rotterdam Marathon, Boston Marathon, London Marathon, Stockholm Marathon, Berlin Marathon, Chicago Marathon, Amsterdam Marathon, Frankfurt Marathon, New York City Marathon and Valencia Marathon

Mixed martial arts
ESPN: Ultimate Fighting Championship (except PPV main cards); Lux Fight League
Star+: Ultimate Fighting Championship (all events)
Claro Sports: ONE Championship (except PPV main cards)
DAZN: Bushido MMA
DirecTV Sports: Professional Fighters League; Fusion Fighting Championship

Motor sports
ESPN: Formula One; FIA Formula 2 Championship; FIA Formula 3 Championship; Moto GP; Moto 2; Moto 3; MotoE World Cup; W Series;  Dakar Rally; IndyCar Series; IndyLights; FIA World Endurance Championship; Extreme E; Porsche Supercup; Race of Champions; Superbike World Championship; AMA Supersport Championship
Claro Sports: Formula E
TyC Sports: TC 2000; Top Race V6

Multi-sport events 

By Station

2018 Olympic Winter Games  
Pay TV: Claro Sports

2018 Paralympic Winter Games  
Pay TV: Claro Sports

2020 Olympic Summer Games  
Pay TV: Claro Sports

2020 Paralympic Summer Games 
Pay TV: Claro Sports

2022 Olympic Winter Games  
Pay TV: Claro Sports

2022 Paralympic Winter Games  
Pay TV: Claro Sports

2024 Olympic Summer Games  
Pay TV: Claro Sports

2024 Paralympic Summer Games 
Pay TV: Claro Sports

Special Olympics World Games  
ESPN

World Games  
ESPN

Commonwealth Games  
ESPN

Parapan American Games 
ESPN

Universiade 
ESPN

Aurora Games 
ESPN

European Games 
Claro Sports

Padel 
ESPN: Premier Padel and A1 Padel

Polo
ESPN: Argentine Open Polo Championship; Hurlingham Open Polo Championship; Tortugas Country Club Open Championship; U.S. Open Polo Championship; Copa Cámara de Diputados; Queen's Cup; USPA Gold Cup; Municipalidad del Pilar; East Coast Open; CW Whitney Cup; Royal Windsor; Coronation Cup; Abierto de San Jorge; Abierto Argentino Juvenil; Torneo Metropolitano de Alto Handicap; Copa Presidente; World Polo League; Copa de Las Naciones; Abierto Argentino de Polo Femenino

Rugby
ESPN: Rugby World Cup; Women's Rugby World Cup; Six Nations; The Rugby Championship; Super Rugby; European Rugby Champions Cup; European Rugby Challenge Cup; Top 14; Premiership Rugby; Super Rugby Americas; United Rugby Championship; Currie Cup; National Provincial Championship; Women's Six Nations Championship; Super Rugby Aupiki; Farah Palmer Cup; World Rugby Under 20 Championship; Americas Rugby Trophy; Rugby World Cup Sevens; World Rugby Sevens Series; World Rugby Women's Sevens Series; World Rugby Sevens Challenger Series; Top 12 de la URBA; Nacional de Clubes; Copa Chile; Campeonato Uruguayo de Rugby; Test-matches

Skiing
ESPN: FIS Alpine World Ski Championships; FIS Nordic World Ski Championships; FIS Snowboard World Championships; FIS Freestyle World Ski Championships; FIS Alpine Ski World Cup; FIS Cross-Country World Cup; FIS Freestyle Ski World Cup; FIS Nordic Combined World Cup; FIS Ski Jumping World Cup; FIS Snowboard World Cup

Table tennis 
ESPN: World Table Tennis Championships; World Table Tennis; Asian Cup Table Tennis Tournament; ITTF World Youth Championships

Tennis
ESPN: Australian Open; French Open; Wimbledon; US Open; ATP Finals; ATP Tour Masters 1000; ATP Tour 500; ATP Tour 250; WTA Finals; WTA 1000; WTA 500; WTA 250; Next Generation ATP Finals; Laver Cup; World Tennis Championship
DirecTV Sports: Davis Cup

Volleyball
ESPN: FIVB Volleyball Women's World Championship; FIVB Volleyball Men's World Championship; FIVB Volleyball Women's Nations League, FIVB Volleyball Men's Nations League, CEV Women's Champions League, CEV Champions League, FIVB Volleyball Women's Club World Championship, FIVB Volleyball Men's Club World Championship, Italian Volleyball League, FIVB Beach Volleyball World Championships and Beach Pro Tour
TyC Sports: Serie A1

Water sports
ESPN: FINA World Aquatics Championships; FINA World Junior Swimming Championships

Weightlifting
ESPN: World Weightlifting Championships

Wrestling
Star+ and Fox Sports: WWE Raw, WWE SmackDown

Yachting
ESPN: America's Cup, America's Cup Qualifiers and Challenger Playoffs and America's Cup World Series

Association football

European international tournaments

UEFA Champions League
ESPN

UEFA Europa League
ESPN

UEFA Europa Conference League
ESPN

UEFA Super Cup
ESPN

UEFA Youth League
ESPN

UEFA Women's Championship
ESPN

UEFA European Championship qualifying
ESPN

UEFA Nations League
ESPN

UEFA European Under-21 Championship
ESPN

UEFA European Under-19 Championship
ESPN

UEFA European Under-17 Championship
ESPN

UEFA Women's Under-19 Championship
ESPN

UEFA Women's Under-17 Championship
ESPN

UEFA Futsal Championship
ESPN

UEFA Futsal Champions League
ESPN

UEFA Women's Futsal Championship
ESPN

UEFA Under-19 Futsal Championship
ESPN

European national leagues

Premier League 
 ESPN

FA Women's Super League 
ESPN

EFL Championship
ESPN

La Liga 
ESPN and DirecTV Sports

Segunda División  
ESPN and DirecTV Sports

Serie A 
ESPN

Women's Serie A
ESPN

Bundesliga 
ESPN

2. Bundesliga 
ESPN

Ligue 1 
ESPN and TV5Monde

Eredivisie 
ESPN

Primeira Liga
GOL TV and RTP Internacional

Belgian First Division A 
ESPN

Scottish Premiership
ESPN

Süper Lig
ESPN

Super League Greece
ESPN

European national cups
FA Cup: ESPN 
Women's FA Cup: ESPN
EFL Cup: ESPN 
EFL Trophy: ESPN
FA Community Shield: ESPN
Women's FA Community Shield: ESPN
FA Youth Cup: ESPN
Copa del Rey: DirecTV Sports
Supercopa de España: DirecTV Sports
Coppa Italia: ESPN
Coppa Italia (women): ESPN
Supercoppa Italiana: ESPN
Supercoppa Italiana (women): ESPN
German Cup: ESPN 
German Super Cup: ESPN
Coupe de France:
Trophée des Champions: ESPN
Taça de Portugal: ESPN
Taça da Liga: ESPN
Supertaça Cândido de Oliveira: ESPN 
Belgian Cup: ESPN 
Belgian Super Cup: ESPN
Scottish Cup: ESPN
Scottish League Cup: ESPN

Latin American tournaments

Copa CONMEBOL Libertadores
ESPN

Copa CONMEBOL Sudamericana
DirecTV Sports and ESPN

Recopa Sudamericana
ESPN

Campeonato Brasileiro Série A
 ESPN and Globo International

Campeonato Brasileiro Série B
 ESPN

Copa do Brasil
 GOL TV and Globo International

Campeonato Paulista
 Globo International

Campeonato Carioca
 Globo International

Liga Profesional de Futbol (Argentina)
ESPN Premium and TNT Sports (Only for Argentina): All matches per round.
Televisión Pública and ESPN (Only for Argentina): Only two matches released per round.
ESPN (Except Argentina): 6 matches per round.
TyC Sports (Except Argentina): 8 matches per round

Copa Argentina
TyC Sports

Supercopa Argentina 
TNT Sports and ESPN Premium (Only for Argentina)
ESPN (Except Argentina)

Bolivian Primera División
 Tigo Sports

Categoría Primera A
Win Sports: 5 matches per round.
Win Sports+: All matches per round.

Categoría Primera B 
Win Sports: 1 match per round.
Win Sports+: 3 match per round.

Ecuadorian Serie A
GOL TV
ESPN

Chilean Primera División 
TNT Sports: All matches per round.

Primera B de Chile 
TNT Sports: Three matches per round.

Peruvian Primera División 
Gol Perú
ESPN (except Peru)

Uruguayan Primera División 
VTV Plus: All matches per matchday. 
ESPN

Paraguayan Primera División 
Tigo Sports/Tigo Sports 2/Tigo Sports+: All matches per matchday.

Venezuelan Primera División
TVes and GOL TV
ESPN (except Venezuela)

CONCACAF Champions League
ESPN

CONCACAF League
ESPN

Liga MX 
ESPN (Atlético San Luis, Mazatlán and Puebla home matches)

Liga MX Femenil 
ESPN (Atlético San Luis and Mazatlán home matches)

Liga de Expansión MX
ESPN

Other leagues and tournaments 
USL Championship: ESPN
USL League One: ESPN
CONCACAF Nations League: ESPN
CONCACAF W Championship: ESPN
CONCACAF Under-20 Championship: ESPN
CONCACAF Under-17 Championship: ESPN
AFC Champions League: ESPN
AFC Cup: ESPN
AFC U-23 Asian Cup: ESPN
AFC U-20 Asian Cup: ESPN
AFC Futsal Asian Cup: ESPN
Australia Cup: ESPN
Africa Cup of Nations: ESPN
WAFU Nations Cup: ESPN
CAF Champions League: ESPN
Toulon Tournament: ESPN 
Florida Cup: ESPN 
Audi Cup: ESPN

FIFA World Cup qualification (UEFA) 
ESPN

FIFA World Cup qualification (CAF)
ESPN

FIFA World Cup qualification (AFC) 
ESPN

FIFA World Cup qualification (CONCACAF)
ESPN

FIFA international matches 

FIFA World Cup: DirecTV Sports; Televisión Pública/TyC Sports (Only for Argentina); Red ATB/Red Uno/Unitel (Only for Bolivia); Chilevisión/TVN/Mega/Canal 13 (Only for Chile); RCN/Caracol (Only for Colombia); RTS/TeleAmazonas (Only for Ecuador); Telefuturo/SNT/Trece/Tigo Sports (Only for Paraguay); Latina (Only for Peru); Canal 4/Canal 10/Tele (Only for Uruguay); TVES/Venevisión/Televen (Only for Venezuela) 
FIFA U-20 World Cup: DirecTV Sports
FIFA Confederations Cup: DirecTV Sports
FIFA Club World Cup: DirecTV Sports
FIFA U-17 World Cup: DirecTV Sports
FIFA Women's World Cup: DirecTV Sports;  Televisión Pública/TyC Sports (Only for Argentina); Red ATB/Red Uno/Unitel (Only for Bolivia); Chilevisión/TVN/Mega/Canal 13 (Only for Chile); RCN/Caracol (Only for Colombia); RTS/TeleAmazonas (Only for Ecuador); Telefuturo/SNT/Trece/Tigo Sports (Only for Paraguay); Latina (Only for Peru); Canal 4/Canal 10/Tele (Only for Uruguay); TVES/Venevisión/Televen (Only for Venezuela)
FIFA U-20 Women's World Cup: DirecTV Sports
FIFA U-17 Women's World Cup: DirecTV Sports

References 

Latin American media
 Latin America
Latin America-related lists